The Henderson State Reddies is the school mascot and athletic emblem for Henderson State University, located in Arkadelphia, Arkansas. Henderson athletic teams compete in NCAA Division II intercollegiate sports and they are members of the Great American Conference for all 12 varsity sports.

That Old Reddie Spirit

Upon its establishment in 1905, the Henderson State football team became known for wearing red jerseys. Absent a traditional nickname or mascot, the team was appropriately dubbed the “Reds.” Eventually, the name shifted to “Reddies,” and it stuck.

Varsity teams

List of teams

Men's sports
 Baseball
 Basketball
 Football
 Golf
 Swimming & Diving

Women's sports
 Basketball
 Cross Country
 Golf
 Softball
 Swimming & Diving
 Tennis
 Volleyball

Individual sports

Baseball

Henderson State has had 7 Major League Baseball Draft selections since the draft began in 1965.

Men's Basketball

Football

Sports culture

Battle of the Ravine

The Battle of the Ravine is a rivalry game between Henderson State University and Ouachita Baptist University. It is currently the oldest rivalry of any NCAA Division II institutions. The first game was played on November 8, 1895 (Thanksgiving Day) and Ouachita College beat Arkadelphia Methodist College 8–0. The next meeting did not occur until 1907 in the first sanctioned game of the series. The Reddies defeated Ouachita and went on to claim the Arkansas State Championship.

The Reddies went on to win the next six meetings and the game was played on Thanksgiving Day. Both teams also made the game their homecoming. The series was discontinued in 1951 after Henderson won 54–0 and the pranks got out of control. The series resumed in 1963 with the Reddies winning 28–13. The series continued until 1993 when Henderson State moved to the NCAA Division II Gulf South Conference. It continued again in 1996 when Ouachita Baptist University moved to the Lone Star Conference. OBU joined the GSC in 2000 and the two schools did not play each other in 2004 or 2005 as a result of schedule rotation. In total, the two schools have met 85 times. Henderson State currently leads the series 41–39–6.

Showband of Arkansas
Considered one of the finest college marching bands in the country, the “Showband of Arkansas” consists of 150 winds, percussion, and auxiliary members. The mission of the “Showband of Arkansas” is to represent, foster and promote the “Reddie Spirit” through musical and visual performance. Composed of students from all academic disciplines, the “Showband of Arkansas” frequently performs as the feature band at high school marching contests, enjoys travel to exciting away-games and regularly thrills thousands of Reddie spectators at home football games. It is open to any student by audition, regardless of major.

References

External links